The Auxiliary University Programs (AUP) is a United States Coast Guard Auxiliary-managed initiative established in 2007. Today AUP now has nearly 200 members in 11 units representing over 30 colleges and universities across the United States. The Auxiliary University Program (AUP) prepares undergraduate and graduate students for future public service inside and outside of the Coast Guard. AUP provides the opportunity to attend college while learning to gain boating education, to learn about homeland security, and to gain operational and leadership experience.  AUP has a positive track record of getting a large number of its graduates into Coast Guard Officer Candidate School. Members graduating AUP and choosing to enlist are automatically promotable to E-3 pay grade/rank when joining.

Overview 
AUP programs on university campuses are organized as detachments of nearby Auxiliary flotillas. Students complete a "basic auxiliary programs" training curriculum taught by local auxiliarists and older students, after which they volunteer 60 hours per semester with their local flotilla. As of 2019, AUP flotillas were present at Auburn University, the California Maritime Academy, The Citadel, New York Maritime Academy, John Jay College of Criminal Justice, University of Southern Mississippi, Texas A&M University, Virginia Tech, University of Central Florida, University of Virginia, College of William & Mary. To join the AUP a student must first join the Coast Guard Auxiliary and then join the university program.

Academic Studies 

Academic Studies classes are the academic portion of AUP. In general, AUP programs are structured around general courses, typically at the beginning of the AUP program, and elective courses that allow for a specialty or concentration.  Students are required to take three general courses, a leadership capstone, and at least one elective.  In addition, students must also earn at minimum one qualification (Air Observer, Boat Crew, Marine Safety, Public Affairs, Telecommunications, or Vessel Examiner).

General Courses
All three are required in the program of study.
AUP101 - Basic Introduction Course
AUP103 - Incident Management
AUP110 - Safe Boating

Elective Courses
At minimum one course must be completed.
AUP210 - Boat Operations
AUP220 - Communications
AUP230 - Marine Safety
AUP240 - Vessel Examination
AUP250 - Public Affairs
AUP260 - Aviation

Leadership Capstone
At minimum one capstone must be completed.
AUP301 - Leadership and Management
AUP303 - Independent Project
AUP304 - Homeland Security
AUP305 - Unit Leadership

Internship Program
The AUP internship program is an opportunity available to students in Approval Pending (AP) Status.  The application process requires the member to apply on the AUP Website with a personal statement and all of the required supporting materials.  The program is operated by an Internship Program Manager. The program can place students at Coast Guard Headquarters and other operational or mission support units across the United States or virtually.  To received academic credit the student is advised to work with their college or university ahead of time to ensure they get academic credit.  Upon completing the internship the member will receive credit for completing the AUP401 Course.

Additional Training Opportunities 

The Coast Guard Auxiliary provides an opportunity for AUP Member to take Incident Command System (ICS) courses through FEMA's Emergency Management Institute (EMI) and additional training opportunities through the Auxiliary Learning Management System.

Center for Homeland Defense and Security Courses
Auxiliarists may register and participate in the Naval Postgraduate School Center for Homeland Defense and Security Self Study Courses. As of 2019, over 10 online courses are available.

Schools & Locations 
A list of all of the schools/locations are available on AUP's website.

See also
 United States Coast Guard Auxiliary
 United States Coast Guard
 Department of Homeland Security

References

External links
Official AUP website
U.S. Coast Guard Auxiliary

2007 establishments in the United States
Sea rescue organizations
United States Coast Guard
Auxiliary military units